Artificial cranial deformation or modification, head flattening, or head binding is a form of body alteration in which the skull of a human being is deformed intentionally. It is done by distorting the normal growth of a child's skull by applying force. Flat shapes, elongated ones (produced by binding between two pieces of wood), rounded ones (binding in cloth), and conical ones are among those chosen or valued in various cultures. Typically, the shape alteration is carried out on an infant, as the skull is most pliable at this time. In a typical case, headbinding begins approximately a month after birth and continues for about six months.

History

Intentional cranial deformation predates written history; it was practiced commonly in a number of cultures that are widely separated geographically and chronologically, and still occurs today in a few areas, including Vanuatu.

The earliest suggested examples were once thought to include Neanderthals and the Proto-Neolithic Homo sapiens component (9th millennium BCE) from Shanidar Cave in Iraq, The view that the Neanderthal skull was artificially deformed, thus representing the oldest example of such practices by tens of thousands of years, was common for a period. However, later research by Chech, Grove, Thorne, and Trinkaus, based on new cranial reconstructions in 1999, questioned the earlier findings and concluded: "we no longer consider that artificial cranial deformation can be inferred for the specimen". It is thought elongated skulls found among Neolithic peoples in Southwest Asia were the result of artificial cranial deformation.

The earliest written record of cranial deformation comes from Hippocrates in about 400 BCE. He described a group known as the Macrocephali or Long-heads, who were named for their practice of cranial modification.

Central Asia
In the Old World, Huns also are known to have practised similar cranial deformation, as were the people known as the Alans. In Late Antiquity (300–600 CE), the East Germanic tribes who were ruled by the Huns, the Gepids, Ostrogoths, Heruli, Rugii, and Burgundians adopted this custom. Among the Lombards, the Burgundians and the Thuringians, this custom seems to have comprised women only. In western Germanic tribes, artificial skull deformations rarely have been found.

The practice of cranial deformation was brought to Bactria and Sogdiana by the Yuezhi, a tribe that created the Kushan Empire. Men with such skulls are depicted in various surviving sculptures and friezes of that time, such as the Kushan prince of Khalchayan.

Alchon kings are generally recognized by their elongated skull, a result of artificial skull deformation. Archaeologist Cameron Petrie wrote that "The depictions of elongated heads suggest that the Alchon kings engaged in skull modification, which was also practised by the Hun groups that appeared in Europe". The elongated skulls appears clearly in most of the portraits of rulers in the coinage of the Alkhon Huns, and most visibly on the coinage of Khingila. These elongated skulls, which they obviously displayed with pride, distinguished them from other peoples, such as their predecessors the Kidarites. On their coins, the spectacular skulls came to replace the Sasanian-type crowns which had been current in the coinage of the region. This practice is also known among other peoples of the steppes, particularly the Huns, and as far as Europe, where it was introduced by the Huns themselves.

Americas
In the Americas, the Maya, Inca, and certain tribes of North American natives performed the custom. In North America the practice was known, especially among the Chinookan tribes of the Northwest and the Choctaw of the Southeast. The Native American group known as the Flathead Indians, in fact, did not practise head flattening, but were named as such in contrast to other Salishan people who used skull modification to make the head appear rounder. Other tribes, including both Southeastern tribes like the Choctaw and Northwestern tribes like the Chehalis and Nooksack Indians, practiced head flattening by strapping the infant's head to a cradleboard.

The practice of cranial deformation was also practiced by the Lucayan people of the Bahamas and the Taínos of the Caribbean.

Austronesia
The Visayans and the Bikolano people of the central islands of the Philippines practiced flattening the foreheads (and sometimes the back of the heads) widely in the pre-colonial period, particularly in the islands of Samar and Tablas. Other regions where remains with artificial cranial deformations have been found include Albay, Butuan, Marinduque, Cebu, Bohol, Surigao, and Davao. The pre-colonial standard of beauty among these groups were of broad faces and receding foreheads, with the ideal skull dimensions being of equal length and width. These were bound to a baby's forehead with bandages and fastened at the back.

They were first recorded in 1604 by the Spanish priest Diego Bobadilla. He reported that in the central Philippines, people placed the heads of children between two boards to horizontally flatten their skulls towards the back, and that they viewed this as a mark of beauty. Other historic sources confirmed the practice, further identifying it as also being a practice done by the nobility (tumao) as a mark of social status, although whether it was restricted to nobility is still unclear. 

Other body modification practices associated with Philippine artificial cranial deformation include blackened and filed teeth, extensive tattooing (batok, which was also a mark of status and beauty), genital piercings, circumcision, and ear plugs. Similar practices have also been documented among the Melanau of Sarawak, the Minahasans of Sulawesi, and some non-Islamized groups in Sumatra.

Friedrich Ratzel reported in 1896 that deformation of the skull, both by flattening it behind and elongating it toward the vertex, was found in isolated instances in Tahiti, Samoa, Hawaii, and the Paumotu group, and that it occurred most frequently on Mallicollo in the New Hebrides (today Malakula, Vanuatu), where the skull was squeezed extraordinarily flat.

Africa
In Africa, the Mangbetu stood out to European explorers because of their elongated heads. Traditionally, babies' heads were wrapped tightly with cloth, called "Limpombo", in order to give them this distinctive appearance. The practice began dying out in the 1950s.

Europe

The custom of binding babies' heads in Europe in the twentieth century, though dying out at the time, was still extant in France, and also found in pockets in western Russia, the Caucasus, and in Scandinavia.  The reasons for the shaping of the head varied over time, from aesthetic to pseudoscientific ideas about the brain's ability to hold certain types of thought depending on its shape. In the region of Toulouse (France), these cranial deformations persisted sporadically up until the early twentieth century; however, rather than being intentionally produced as with some earlier European cultures, Toulousian Deformation seemed to have been the unwanted result of an ancient medical practice among the French peasantry known as bandeau, in which a baby's head was tightly wrapped and padded in order to protect it from impact and accident shortly after birth. In fact, many of the early modern observers of the deformation were recorded as pitying these peasant children, whom they believed to have been lowered in intelligence due to the persistence of old European customs.

Methods and types
Deformation usually begins just after birth for the next couple of years until the desired shape has been reached or the child rejects the apparatus.

There is no broadly established classification system of cranial deformations, and many scientists have developed their own classification systems without agreeing on a single system for all forms observed. An example of an individual system is that of E. V. Zhirov, who described three main types of artificial cranial deformation—round, fronto-occipital, and sagittal—for occurrences in Europe and Asia, in the 1940s.

Motivations and theories
One modern theory is cranial deformation was likely performed to signify group affiliation, or to demonstrate social status. Such motivations may have played a key role in Maya society, aimed at creating a skull shape that is aesthetically more pleasing or associated with desirable cultural attributes. For example, in the Na'ahai-speaking area of Tomman Island and the south south-western Malakulan (Australasia), a person with an elongated head is thought to be more intelligent, of higher status, and closer to the world of the spirits.

Historically, there have been a number of various theories regarding the motivations for these practices.

It has also been considered possible that the practice of cranial deformation originates from an attempt to emulate those groups of the population in which elongated head shape was a natural condition. The skulls of some Ancient Egyptians are among those identified as often being elongated naturally and macrocephaly may be a familial characteristic. For example, Rivero and Tschudi describe an Inca mummy containing a fetus with an elongated skull, describing it thus:

 
P. F. Bellamy makes a similar observation about the two elongated skulls of infants, which were discovered and brought to England by a "Captain Blankley" and handed over to the Museum of the Devon and Cornwall Natural History Society in 1838. According to Bellamy, these skulls belonged to two infants, female and male, "one of which was not more than a few months old, and the other could not be much more than one year."  He writes,

Health effects
There is no statistically significant difference in cranial capacity between artificially deformed skulls and normal skulls in Peruvian samples.

See also
Deformational plagiocephaly
Foot binding

References

Further reading
 
 Tiesler, Vera (2013) The Bioarchaeology of Artificial Cranial Modifications: New Approaches to Head Shaping and its Meanings in Pre-Columbian Mesoamerica and Beyond [Vol. 7, Springer Interdisciplinary Contributions to Archaeology], Berlin, NY, USA:Springer Science & Business, see , accessed 1 August 2015.
 FitzSimmons, Ellen; Jack H. Prost & Sharon Peniston (1998) "Infant Head Molding, A Cultural Practice," Arch. Fam. Med., 7 (January/February).
 
 Henshen, F. (1966) The Human Skull: A Cultural History, New York, NY, USA: Frederick A. Praeger.

External links

Why early humans reshaped their children's skulls
Mathematical Analysis of Artificial Cranial Deformation
 Parents Have Been Reshaping Their Kids’ Skulls for 45,000 Years

Body modification
Skull
Traditions